The Yabloko — United Democrats (Yabloko — Obyedinonnyye demokraty) was a coalition between Yabloko party and the Union of Right Forces formed for the Moscow municipal elections on December 4, 2005.

During the campaign, the coalition declared its opposition to the policies of President Vladimir Putin and called for the restoration of political and media freedoms, curtailed by the Putin administration. Yabloko-United Democrats won 11% of the vote and became one of only three parties (along with United Russia and the Communist Party) to enter the new Moscow City Duma. Its deputies in the Duma are Yevgeny Bunimovich (Yabloko), Sergei Mitrokhin (Yabloko) and Ivan Novitsky (Union of Right Forces).

Electoral results

Moscow City Duma elections 

2005 establishments in Russia
Defunct political party alliances in Russia
Liberal parties in Russia
Union of Right Forces
Yabloko